Soil contamination, soil pollution, or land pollution as a part of land degradation is caused by the presence of xenobiotic (human-made) chemicals or other alteration in the natural soil environment.  It is typically caused by industrial activity, agricultural chemicals or improper disposal of waste. The most common chemicals involved are petroleum hydrocarbons, polynuclear aromatic hydrocarbons (such as naphthalene and benzo(a)pyrene), solvents, pesticides, lead, and other heavy metals. Contamination is correlated with the degree of industrialization and intensity of chemical substance. The concern over soil contamination stems primarily from health risks, from direct contact with the contaminated soil, vapour from the contaminants, or from secondary contamination of water supplies within and underlying the soil. Mapping of contaminated soil sites and the resulting cleanups are time-consuming and expensive tasks, and require expertise in geology, hydrology, chemistry, computer modeling, and GIS in Environmental Contamination, as well as an appreciation of the history of industrial chemistry.

In North America and Western Europe the extent of contaminated land is best known, with many of countries in these areas having a legal framework to identify and deal with this environmental problem.  Developing countries tend to be less tightly regulated despite some of them having undergone significant industrialization.

Causes 
Soil pollution can be caused by the following (non-exhaustive list) :
 Microplastics
 Oil spills
 Mining and activities by other heavy industries
 Accidental spills may happen during activities, etc.
 Corrosion of underground storage tanks (including piping used to transmit the contents)
 Acid rain
 Intensive farming
 Agrochemicals, such as pesticides, herbicides and fertilizers
 Petrochemicals
 Industrial accidents
 Road debris
 Construction activities
 Exterior lead-based paints
 Drainage of contaminated surface water into the soil
 Ammunitions, chemical agents, and other agents of war
 Waste disposal
 Oil and fuel dumping
 Nuclear wastes
 Direct discharge of industrial wastes to the soil
 Discharge of sewage 
 Landfill and illegal dumping
 Coal ash
 Electronic waste
Contaminated by rocks containing large amounts of toxic elements.
Contaminated by Pb due to vehicle exhaust, Cd, and Zn caused by tire wear.
Contamination by strengthening air pollutants by incineration of fossil raw materials.
The most common chemicals involved are petroleum hydrocarbons, solvents, pesticides, lead, and other heavy metals.

Any activity that leads to other forms of soil degradation (erosion, compaction, etc.) may indirectly worsen the contamination effects in that soil remediation becomes more tedious.

Historical deposition of coal ash used for residential, commercial, and industrial heating, as well as for industrial processes such as ore smelting, were a common source of contamination in areas that were industrialized before about 1960. Coal naturally concentrates lead and zinc during its formation, as well as other heavy metals to a lesser degree. When the coal is burned, most of these metals become concentrated in the ash (the principal exception being mercury). Coal ash and slag may contain sufficient lead to qualify as a "characteristic hazardous waste", defined in the US as containing more than 5 mg/L of extractable lead using the TCLP procedure. In addition to lead, coal ash typically contains variable but significant concentrations of polynuclear aromatic hydrocarbons (PAHs; e.g., benzo(a)anthracene, benzo(b)fluoranthene, benzo(k)fluoranthene, benzo(a)pyrene, indeno(cd)pyrene, phenanthrene, anthracene, and others). These PAHs are known human carcinogens and the acceptable concentrations of them in soil are typically around 1 mg/kg. Coal ash and slag can be recognised by the presence of off-white grains in soil, gray heterogeneous soil, or (coal slag) bubbly, vesicular pebble-sized grains.

Treated sewage sludge, known in the industry as biosolids, has become controversial as a "fertilizer". As it is the byproduct of sewage treatment, it generally contains more contaminants such as organisms, pesticides, and heavy metals than other soil.

In the European Union, the Urban Waste Water Treatment Directive allows sewage sludge to be sprayed onto land. The volume is expected to double to 185,000 tons of dry solids in 2005. This has good agricultural properties due to the high nitrogen and phosphate content. In 1990/1991, 13% wet weight was sprayed onto 0.13% of the land; however, this is expected to rise 15 fold by 2005.  Advocates say there is a need to control this so that pathogenic microorganisms do not get into water courses and to ensure that there is no accumulation of heavy metals in the top soil.

Pesticides and herbicides

A pesticide is a substance used to kill a pest. A pesticide may be a chemical substance, biological agent (such as a virus or bacteria), antimicrobial, disinfectant or device used against any pest. Pests include insects, plant pathogens, weeds, mollusks, birds, mammals, fish, nematodes (roundworms) and microbes that compete with humans for food, destroy property, spread or are a vector for disease or cause a nuisance. Although there are benefits to the use of pesticides, there are also drawbacks, such as potential toxicity to humans and other organisms.

Herbicides are used to kill weeds, especially on pavements and railways. They are similar to auxins and most are biodegradable by soil bacteria. However, one group derived from trinitrotoluene (2:4 D and 2:4:5 T) have the impurity dioxin, which is very toxic and causes fatality even in low concentrations. Another herbicide is Paraquat. It is highly toxic but it rapidly degrades in soil due to the action of bacteria and does not kill soil fauna.

Insecticides are used to rid farms of pests which damage crops. The insects damage not only standing crops but also stored ones and in the tropics it is reckoned that one third of the total production is lost during food storage. As with fungicides, the first insecticides used in the nineteenth century were inorganic e.g. Paris Green and other compounds of arsenic. Nicotine has also been used since 1690.

There are now two main groups of synthetic insecticides –

1. Organochlorines include DDT, Aldrin, Dieldrin and BHC. They are cheap to produce, potent and persistent. DDT was used on a massive scale from the 1930s, with a peak of 72,000 tonnes used 1970. Then usage fell as the harmful environmental effects were realized. It was found worldwide in fish and birds and was even discovered in the snow in the Antarctic. It is only slightly soluble in water but is very soluble in the bloodstream. It affects the nervous and endocrine systems and causes the eggshells of birds to lack calcium causing them to be  easily breakable. It is thought to be responsible for the decline of the numbers of birds of prey like ospreys and peregrine falcons in the 1950s – they are now recovering. As well as increased concentration via the food chain, it is known to enter via permeable membranes, so fish get it through their gills. As it has low water solubility, it tends to stay at the water surface, so organisms that live there are most affected. DDT found in fish that formed part of the human food chain caused concern, but the levels found in the liver, kidney and brain tissues was less than 1 ppm and in fat was 10 ppm, which was below the level likely to cause harm. However, DDT was banned in the UK and the United States to stop the further buildup of it in the food chain. U.S. manufacturers continued to sell DDT to developing countries, who could not afford the expensive replacement chemicals and who did not have such stringent regulations governing the use of pesticides.

2. Organophosphates, e.g. parathion, methyl parathion and about 40 other insecticides are available nationally. Parathion is highly toxic, methyl-parathion is less so and Malathion is generally considered safe as it has low toxicity and is rapidly broken down in the mammalian liver. This group works by preventing normal nerve transmission as cholinesterase is prevented from breaking down the transmitter substance acetylcholine, resulting in uncontrolled muscle movements.

Agents of war 
The disposal of munitions, and a lack of care in manufacture of munitions caused by the urgency of production, can contaminate soil for extended periods. There is little published evidence on this type of contamination largely because of restrictions placed by governments of many countries on the publication of material related to war effort. However, mustard gas stored during World War II has contaminated some sites for up to 50 years and the testing of Anthrax as a potential biological weapon contaminated the whole island of Gruinard.

Human health

Exposure pathways 
Contaminated or polluted soil directly affects human health through direct contact with soil or via inhalation of soil contaminants that have vaporized; potentially greater threats are posed by the infiltration of soil contamination into groundwater aquifers used for human consumption, sometimes in areas apparently far removed from any apparent source of above-ground contamination. Toxic metals can also make their way up the food chain through plants that reside in soils containing high concentrations of heavy metals. This tends to result in the development of pollution-related diseases.

Most exposure is accidental, and exposure can happen through:

 Ingesting dust or soil directly
 Ingesting food or vegetables grown in contaminated soil or with foods in contact with contaminants
 Skin contact with dust or soil
 Vapors from the soil
 Inhaling clouds of dust while working in soils or windy environments

However, some studies estimate that 90% of exposure is through eating contaminated food.

Consequences 
Health consequences from exposure to soil contamination vary greatly depending on pollutant type, the pathway of attack, and the vulnerability of the exposed population. Researchers suggest that pesticides and heavy metals in soil may harm cardiovascular health, including inflammation and change in the body's internal clock. 

Chronic exposure to chromium, lead , and other metals, petroleum, solvents, and many pesticide and herbicide formulations can be carcinogenic, can cause congenital disorders, or can cause other chronic health conditions.  Industrial or man-made concentrations of naturally occurring substances, such as nitrate and ammonia associated with livestock manure from agricultural operations, have also been identified as health hazards in soil and groundwater.

Chronic exposure to benzene at sufficient concentrations is known to be associated with a higher incidence of leukemia. Mercury and cyclodienes are known to induce higher incidences of kidney damage and some irreversible diseases. PCBs and cyclodienes are linked to liver toxicity. Organophosphates and carbonates can cause a chain of responses leading to neuromuscular blockage. Many chlorinated solvents induce liver changes, kidney changes, and depression of the central nervous system. There is an entire spectrum of further health effects such as headache, nausea, fatigue, eye irritation and skin rash for the above cited and other chemicals. At sufficient dosages a large number of soil contaminants can cause death by exposure via direct contact, inhalation or ingestion of contaminants in groundwater contaminated through soil.

The Scottish Government has commissioned the Institute of Occupational Medicine to undertake a review of methods to assess risk to human health from contaminated land. The overall aim of the project is to work up guidance that should be useful to Scottish Local Authorities in assessing whether sites represent a significant possibility of significant harm (SPOSH) to human health. It is envisaged that the output of the project will be a short document providing high level guidance on health risk assessment with reference to existing published guidance and methodologies that have been identified as being particularly relevant and helpful. The project will examine how policy guidelines have been developed for determining the acceptability of risks to human health and propose an approach for assessing what constitutes unacceptable risk in line with the criteria for SPOSH as defined in the legislation and the Scottish Statutory Guidance.

Ecosystem effects

Not unexpectedly, soil contaminants can have significant deleterious consequences for ecosystems. There are radical soil chemistry changes which can arise from the presence of many hazardous chemicals even at low concentration of the contaminant species. These changes can manifest in the alteration of metabolism of endemic microorganisms and arthropods resident in a given soil environment. The result can be virtual eradication of some of the primary food chain, which in turn could have major consequences for predator or consumer species. Even if the chemical effect on lower life forms is small, the lower pyramid levels of the food chain may ingest alien chemicals, which normally become more concentrated for each consuming rung of the food chain. Many of these effects are now well known, such as the concentration of persistent DDT materials for avian consumers, leading to weakening of egg shells, increased chick mortality and potential extinction of species.

Effects occur to agricultural lands which have certain types of soil contamination.  Contaminants typically alter plant metabolism, often causing a reduction in crop yields.  This has a secondary effect upon soil conservation, since the languishing crops cannot shield the Earth's soil from erosion. Some of these chemical contaminants have long half-lives and in other cases derivative chemicals are formed from decay of primary soil contaminants.

Potential effects of contaminants to soil functions 
Heavy metals and other soil contaminants can adversely affect the activity, species composition and abundance of soil microorganisms, thereby threatening soil functions such as biochemical cycling of carbon and nitrogen. However, soil contaminants can also become less bioavailable by time, and microorganisms and ecosystems can adapt to altered conditions. Soil properties such as pH, organic matter content and texture are very important and modify mobility, bioavailability and toxicity of pollutants in contaminated soils. The same amount of contaminant can be toxic in one soil but totally harmless in another soil. This stresses the need for soil-specific risks assessment and measures.

Cleanup options

Cleanup or environmental remediation is analyzed by environmental scientists who utilize field measurement of soil chemicals and also apply computer models (GIS in Environmental Contamination) for analyzing transport and fate of soil chemicals. Various technologies have been developed for remediation of oil-contaminated soil and sediments  There are several principal strategies for remediation:
 Excavate soil and take it to a disposal site away from ready pathways for human or sensitive ecosystem contact.  This technique also applies to dredging of bay muds containing toxins.
 Aeration of soils at the contaminated site (with attendant risk of creating air pollution)
 Thermal remediation by introduction of heat to raise subsurface temperatures sufficiently high to volatilize chemical contaminants out of the soil for vapor extraction. Technologies include ISTD, electrical resistance heating (ERH), and ET-DSP.
 Bioremediation, involving microbial digestion of certain organic chemicals. Techniques used in bioremediation include landfarming, biostimulation and bioaugmentating soil biota with commercially available microflora.
 Extraction of groundwater or soil vapor with an active electromechanical system, with subsequent stripping of the contaminants from the extract.
 Containment of the soil contaminants  (such as by capping or paving over in place).
 Phytoremediation, or using plants (such as willow) to extract heavy metals.
 Mycoremediation, or using fungus to metabolize contaminants and accumulate heavy metals.
 Remediation of oil contaminated sediments with self-collapsing air microbubbles.
Surfactant leaching
Interfacial solar evaporation to extract heavy metal ions from moist soil

By country

Various national standards for concentrations of particular contaminants include the United States EPA Region 9 Preliminary Remediation Goals (U.S. PRGs), the U.S. EPA Region 3 Risk Based Concentrations (U.S. EPA RBCs) and National Environment Protection Council of Australia Guideline on Investigation Levels in Soil and Groundwater.

People's Republic of China

The immense and sustained growth of the People's Republic of China since the 1970s has exacted a price from the land in increased soil pollution. The Ministry of Ecology and Environment believes it to be a threat to the environment, to food safety and to sustainable agriculture. According to a scientific sampling, 150 million mu (100,000 square kilometres) of China's cultivated land have been polluted, with contaminated water being used to irrigate a further 32.5 million mu (21,670 square kilometres) and another 2 million mu (1,300 square kilometres) covered or destroyed by solid waste. In total, the area accounts for one-tenth of China's cultivatable land, and is mostly in economically developed areas. An estimated 12 million tonnes of grain are contaminated by heavy metals every year, causing direct losses of 20 billion yuan ($2.57 billion USD). Recent survey shows that 19% of the agricultural soils are contaminated which contains heavy metals and metalloids. And the rate of these heavy metals in the soil has been increased dramatically.

European Union 
According to the received data from Member states, in the European Union the number of estimated potential contaminated sites is more than 2.5 million and the identified contaminated sites around 342 thousand. Municipal and industrial wastes contribute most to soil contamination (38%), followed by the industrial/commercial sector (34%). Mineral oil and heavy metals are the main contaminants contributing around 60% to soil contamination. In terms of budget, the management of contaminated sites is estimated to cost around 6 billion Euros (€) annually.

United Kingdom

Generic guidance commonly used in the United Kingdom are the Soil Guideline Values published by the Department for Environment, Food and Rural Affairs (DEFRA) and the Environment Agency. These are screening values that demonstrate the minimal acceptable level of a substance. Above this there can be no assurances in terms of significant risk of harm to human health. These have been derived using the Contaminated Land Exposure Assessment Model (CLEA UK). Certain input parameters such as Health Criteria Values, age and land use are fed into CLEA UK to obtain a probabilistic output.

Guidance by the Inter Departmental Committee for the Redevelopment of Contaminated Land (ICRCL) has been formally withdrawn by DEFRA, for use as a prescriptive document to determine the potential need for remediation or further assessment.

The CLEA model published by DEFRA and the Environment Agency (EA) in March 2002 sets a framework for the appropriate assessment of risks to human health from contaminated land, as required by Part IIA of the Environmental Protection Act 1990. As part of this framework, generic Soil Guideline Values (SGVs) have currently been derived for ten contaminants to be used as "intervention values". These values should not be considered as remedial targets but values above which further detailed assessment should be considered; see Dutch standards.
 
Three sets of CLEA SGVs have been produced for three different land uses, namely 
 residential (with and without plant uptake)
 allotments
 commercial/industrial

It is intended that the SGVs replace the former ICRCL values. The CLEA SGVs relate to assessing chronic (long term) risks to human health and do not apply to the protection of ground workers during construction, or other potential receptors such as groundwater, buildings, plants or other ecosystems.  The CLEA SGVs are not directly applicable to a site completely covered in hardstanding, as there is no direct exposure route to contaminated soils.
 
To date, the first ten of fifty-five contaminant SGVs have been published, for the following: arsenic, cadmium, chromium, lead, inorganic mercury, nickel, selenium ethyl benzene, phenol and toluene.  Draft SGVs for benzene, naphthalene and xylene have been produced but their publication is on hold.  Toxicological data (Tox) has been published for each of these contaminants as well as for benzo[a]pyrene, benzene, dioxins, furans and dioxin-like PCBs, naphthalene, vinyl chloride, 1,1,2,2 tetrachloroethane and 1,1,1,2 tetrachloroethane, 1,1,1 trichloroethane, tetrachloroethene, carbon tetrachloride, 1,2-dichloroethane, trichloroethene and xylene.  The SGVs for ethyl benzene, phenol and toluene are dependent on the soil organic matter (SOM) content (which can be calculated from the total organic carbon (TOC) content).  As an initial screen the SGVs for 1% SOM are considered to be appropriate.

Canada
As of February 2021, there are a total of 2,500 plus contaminated sites in Canada. One infamous contaminated sited is located near a nickel-copper smelting site in Sudbury, Ontario.  A study investigating the heavy metal pollution in the vicinity of the smelter reveals that elevated levels of nickel and copper were found in the soil; values going as high as 5,104ppm Ni, and 2,892 ppm Cu within a 1.1 km range of the smelter location. Other metals were also found in the soil; such metals include iron, cobalt, and silver. Furthermore, upon examining the different vegetation surrounding the smelter it was evident that they too had been affected; the results show that the plants contained nickel, copper and aluminium as a result of soil contamination.

India
In March 2009, the issue of Uranium poisoning in Punjab attracted press coverage. It was alleged to be caused by fly ash ponds of thermal power stations, which reportedly lead to severe birth defects in children in the Faridkot and Bhatinda districts of Punjab. The news reports claimed the uranium levels were more than 60 times the maximum safe limit. In 2012, the Government of India confirmed that the ground water in Malwa belt of Punjab has uranium metal that is 50% above the trace limits set by the United Nations' World Health Organization (WHO). Scientific studies, based on over 1000 samples from various sampling points, could not trace the source to fly ash and any sources from thermal power plants or industry as originally alleged. The study also revealed that the uranium concentration in ground water of Malwa district is not 60 times the WHO limits, but only 50% above the WHO limit in 3 locations. This highest concentration found in samples was less than those found naturally in ground waters currently used for human purposes elsewhere, such as Finland. Research is underway to identify natural or other sources for the uranium.

See also

 Contamination control
 Dutch pollutant standards
 Environmental policy in China#Soil pollution
 GIS in environmental contamination
 Groundwater pollution
 Habitat destruction
 Index of waste management articles
 Land degradation
 Landfill	
 List of solid waste treatment technologies
 List of waste management companies
 Litter	
 Pesticide drift
 Plasticulture
 Plastic-eating organisms
 Remediation of contaminated sites with cement
 Triangle of death (Italy)
 Water pollution

References

Panagos, P., Van Liedekerke, M., Yigini, Y., Montanarella, L. (2013)  Contaminated Sites in Europe: Review of the Current Situation Based on Data Collected through a European Network. Journal of Environmental and Public Health In Press. doi:10.1155/2013/158764

External links

Portal for soil and water management in Europe Independent information gateway originally funded by the European Commission for topics related to soil and water, including contaminated land, soil and water management.
European Soil Portal: Soil Contamination  At EU-level, the issue of contaminated sites (local contamination) and contaminated land (diffuse contamination) has been considered by:  European Soil Data Centre (ESDAC).
Article on soil contamination in China
Arsenic in groundwater Book on arsenic in groundwater by IAH's Netherlands Chapter and the Netherlands Hydrological Society

 
Environmental chemistry
Environmental issues with soil
Pollution
Soil chemistry